WTPX-TV (channel 46) is a television station licensed to Antigo, Wisconsin, United States, broadcasting the Ion Television network to the Wausau–Rhinelander market. Owned and operated by the Ion Media subsidiary of the E. W. Scripps Company, the station maintains transmitter facilities near Glandon, Wisconsin.

Until 2021, the station's public file was maintained at studios on North Flint Road in Glendale, where WPXE-TV, the Ion station in the Milwaukee market, was based. In October of that year with the 2019 repeal of the Federal Communications Commission (FCC)'s Main Studio Rule, Ion Media officially registered its studio facility (along with most Ion-owned stations) as the Scripps Center in Cincinnati. The same month, Green Bay sister station WGBA-TV launched Ion as its fifth subchannel, with the affiliation moving from WBAY-TV.

Subchannels

The station's digital signal is multiplexed; PSIP is subject to verification:

Paxson Communications/Ion Media chose to run WTPX-TV as a digital-only station upon signing on in 2001, and held no analog license for the station. Thus, WTPX-TV never had any digital transition channel, flash-cut or analog transition period. It moved from its original physical channel 46 to channel 19 during the FCC's spectrum repack in June 2018, but continues to use channel 46 as its virtual channel position.

External links

Ion Television affiliates
Grit (TV network) affiliates
Ion Mystery affiliates
Laff (TV network) affiliates
Bounce TV affiliates
Defy TV affiliates
Scripps News affiliates
E. W. Scripps Company television stations
Television channels and stations established in 2001
2001 establishments in Wisconsin
TPX-TV